Michael Philip Alpers , ,  is an Australian medical researcher, and John Curtin distinguished Professor of International Health, at Curtin University.

Education
Alpers graduated from University of Adelaide with a B.Sc. and M.B.B.S. and from University of Cambridge with an M.A.

Career and research
After graduating, he commenced a career, ultimately resulting in investigating kuru disease.

He is Honorary Senior Research Associate University College London.

Alpers and his work are the main theme of Kuru: The Science and the Sorcery (2010). He is interviewed in The Genius And The Boys (2009).

References

Further reading
 
 
 
 
 

Alumni of the University of Cambridge
Australian medical researchers
Academic staff of Curtin University
Fellows of the Australian Academy of Science
Fellows of the Royal Society
Living people
Officers of the Order of Australia
University of Adelaide Medical School alumni
Year of birth missing (living people)